William Edward "Easy Ed" Ratleff (born March 29, 1950) is an American retired basketball player. He attended Columbus East High School where he led his high school basketball team to the Ohio State Championship in 1968 and was joined by Dwight "Bo" Lamar to claim the 1969 Ohio High School title. In college, Ratleff was a two-time first-team All-American at Long Beach State. He was chosen for the 1972 U.S. Men's Olympic Basketball Team and participated in the Munich Games. He was selected with the sixth pick of the NBA Draft and played five NBA seasons.

High school
Ratleff attended Columbus East High School in Columbus, Ohio, leading his team to the AAA (big school) state championship in 1967-1968 with a 25-0 record. The ’68-69 Tigers were also undefeated state champions. Overall in three seasons he led the Tigers to three state championship games, two state championships and a 70-1 record.

College career and Olympics
A 6'6" guard/forward, he played college basketball at California State University, Long Beach under coach Jerry Tarkanian. He still holds the school's career record for scoring average (21.4). He was twice named first-team AP All-American by the AP, in 1971–72 and 1972–73.

Ratleff played for the United States national basketball team at the 1972 Summer Olympics, where the United States lost a controversial gold medal game to the Soviet Union. Ratleff and his teammates refused to accept silver medals. Throughout the Olympic tournament, Ratleff averaged 6.4 points per game.

Professional career
Ratleff was chosen with the sixth pick in the 1973 NBA draft by the Houston Rockets. He played five season for the Rockets, averaging 8.3 points and 4.0 rebounds in his NBA career.

Personal life
In 1991 his number 42 was retired by Long Beach State. In 2009, he was inducted into the Ohio Basketball Hall of Fame. In 2015, he was part of the class inducted into the College Basketball Hall of Fame and in 2017 he was inducted into the Ohio High School Athletic Association Ring of Champions.

References

1950 births
Living people
20th-century African-American sportspeople
21st-century African-American people
African-American basketball players
All-American college men's basketball players
American men's basketball players
Basketball players at the 1972 Summer Olympics
Basketball players from Ohio
Houston Rockets draft picks
Houston Rockets players
Long Beach State Beach men's basketball players
Medalists at the 1972 Summer Olympics
Olympic silver medalists for the United States in basketball
People from Bellefontaine, Ohio
Shooting guards
Small forwards
United States men's national basketball team players